Manizha Bakhtari (Persian: منیژه باختری) is an Afghan diplomat, author, and journalist.  She currently serves as the Afghan ambassador to Austria. She was the former Afghan ambassador to the Nordic countries (Norway, Sweden, Denmark, Iceland, and Finland). Bakhtari previously served as the Chief of Staff of the Afghan Ministry of Foreign Affairs and as a part-time lecturer at Kabul University.

Life and Education 
Bakhtari is the daughter of Afghan poet Wasef Bakhtari. Bakhtari holds a B.A. in journalism and a M.A. in Persian Language and Literature from Kabul University. In 2002, she was accredited as a lecturer in the Journalism Faculty of Kabul University.

Work 
Prior to her diplomatic posts, Bakhtari worked with the Cooperation Center for Afghanistan (CCA), a non-governmental organization. She is the author of two journalistic books: The interesting World of News and Ethics and Law in Journalism, which are currently used as textbooks in the Journalism Faculty of Kabul University. She is the author of Angabin Neshkhand wa Sharang Noshkhand, a book about the contemporary history of the satirical genre in Afghanistan. She has published a collection of stories titled Three Angels, highlighting the challenges of Afghan women. She was the editor-in-chief of Parnian Magazine (a cultural and literature quarterly magazine).

Personal life 
Bakhtari is married to Naser Hotaki, an Afghan businessman and sports executive. They have four children together: Mariam Hotaki, Mustafa Hotaki, Nosheen Hotaki, and Parnian Hotaki.

References 

Year of birth missing (living people)
Living people
People from Kabul
Afghan journalists
Kabul University alumni
Ambassadors of Afghanistan to Norway
Ambassadors of Afghanistan to Finland
Ambassadors of Afghanistan to Sweden
Ambassadors of Afghanistan to Austria
Afghan women ambassadors
Academic staff of Kabul University